Kudaldeshkar Gaud Brahmin is a community hailing from the western coast of India, residing in the Konkan division of Maharashtra and Goa. This community is also known as Kudaldeshkar Aadya Gaud Brahmin, Kudaldeshkar and sometimes Kudalkar Brahmins. They speak Marathi, Malwani dialect of Konkani.

History 
The Aadya Gaud Brahmins (आद्य गौड ब्रह्मण), who settled near the Kudal region, migrated from the region of Gudadesh (गूडदेश) near Shravasti (श्रावस्ती)  in north India and not from Bengal. Fleeing from the invasion by Muhammad of Ghazni in 1017 CE they migrated south and settled near Kudal in the Konkan region. That is how they came to be known as Kudaldeshkar Gaud Brahmins. Kudaldeshkar literally translates to the one residing in the Kudal region. The area settled by them currently falls under Sawantwadi, Malvan and Vengurla talukas.

Amongst the settlers, one with the name Dev Sharma and his descendants established sovereignty over the region. They were also referred to as Samants. They were the mandalika (मांडलिक) (governor) of this region during the Yadav dynasty. During the rule of Singhana I (CE 1105-1120), Maiendeva (माइन्देव), of the Samant lineage, declared himself independent and established his kingdom in that region, with Kuduwalapattan (कुडुवलपत्तन) (present day Kudal) as the capital. He came to be known as “Mang Mahipati'' (मंग महिपति). He called himself “Samant kula yashobhanu mangalakhya maheshwar”. His descendants, of which some known names were Hemadeva, Bhairavdeva and Nagadeva, ruled that region for 400 years till it was overrun by the Bahamani rulers in 1461 CE. The Bahamani rulers established their own governor by the name of Prabhu, who was the descendant of the previous Samant rulers. The descendants of Prabhu continued to govern this region till 1640 CE when Lakham Sawant (लखम सावंत), a subordinate, revolted and overtook the control of this region. Lakham Sawant is the ancestor of the current royal family of Sawantwadi.

Philosophy 
Kudaldeshkar Gaud Brahmins follow Shankaracharya's Advaita school of philosophy, and have their own three centuries old Matha in Dabholi village in the Indian state of Maharashtra. The first pontiff of the Shreemat Purnanand Swamiji was initiated into Sanyasa by Vishwananda Swamiji. The present 20th pontiff of the Math is Pradyumnanand Swamiji.

Language
The original language of Kudaldeshkars is Malwani. The Malvani dialects of Konkani are also referred to as a creoles between Konkani and Marathi. Today Malwani is more significantly identified as the principal language of Kudaldeshkars and also of the natives of the Sindhudurg district. There is no special script or text characters for Malwani and it is generally written in Devanagari. They also speak Marathi in Maharashtra, and Konkani in Goa and Karnataka. Malwani is also called Kudali, originally known as Kudwali. Kudwal is the ancient name for 'Kudal'.

Diet

Since the community had its base in the Konkan area, food habits are naturally influenced by the sea coast. Their cuisine is of humid tropical nature, rice, spices, kokum, raw mangoes, cashew nuts and coconuts. The Malwani diets characteristics are well distinguished from Goan food. The cuisine contains a variety of spices blended with roasted coconut and coconut milk, the curries are made of finely grated coconut/coconut cream and coconut milk added to it. The Konkan region has Alphanso mangoes, and cashews, bananas, watermelons and pineapples also grow in abundance.

See also
Goud Saraswat Brahmin
Kudal
Konkan
List of Goan Brahmin communities
Rajapur Brahmins

References

External links
Kudaldeshkar Gaud Brahmin Snehavardhak Sangh

Brahmin communities of Goa
Brahmin communities of Maharashtra
Hinduism in Goa